Sandy Hill is a neighbourhood in Ottawa, Ontario, located just east of downtown.  The neighbourhood is bordered on the west by the Rideau Canal, and on the east by the Rideau River.  To the north it stretches to Rideau Street and the Byward Market area while to the south it is bordered by the Queensway highway and Nicholas Street. The area is named for its hilliness, caused by the river, and its sandy soil, which makes it difficult to erect large buildings. It is home to a number of embassies, residences and parks. Le cordon bleu operates its Canadian school there, at the opposite end of Sandy Hill from the University of Ottawa.

According to the 2011 Canadian Census, the population of Sandy Hill was 12,490.

History

Sandy Hill was, during the nineteenth and early twentieth century, Ottawa's wealthiest neighbourhood.  Originally the estate of Louis-Théodore Besserer,
who donated part of this land to University of Ottawa, it was subdivided and
became home to most of Ottawa's lumber barons.  When Ottawa became the country's capital, it became home to senior public servants and to the Prime Minister who lived at Stadacona Hall and later at what is now known as Laurier House.

The construction of bridges over the canal and the introduction of automobiles and streetcars made the area much more accessible to downtown, and it began to decline as the very wealthy moved to Rockcliffe Park.  The neighbourhood became much denser and more middle class.  It was predominantly francophone, and the 1960s Radio-Canada television network drama "La Côte de Sable" was set there, to this day one of the network's only drama set outside Quebec.

The area saw much growth at the end of the Second World War as the baby boom increased the population and the nearby federal government began hiring.  Many of the once grand mansions became embassies. Many nations still have their embassies in Sandy Hill, including those of Russia and of many African nations, which are clustered near the Rideau River. Its population dropped by 30% in the '60s and '70s as families fled the dismal urban planning.  Currently, there are many students living in the area due to its proximity to the University of Ottawa.

Geography

Unusual among modern urban neighbourhoods, Sandy Hill demographics change dramatically within a few blocks. Very wealthy people live near the embassies of the Rideau River, but closer to the university, one finds more students, senior citizens, and new immigrants with more diversified income levels. Housing in the western end of Sandy Hill includes boarding houses, student rental housing, modest privately owned homes and cooperative housing. For example, on Henderson Avenue, a historically Irish working-class sector of Sandy Hill,  there are two Housing Cooperatives: Sandy Hill Housing Co-op and St. Georges Housing Cooperative / la Coopérative d'habitation St Georges, a bilingual, multicultural coop, with residents who come from Canada, with neighbours newly arrived from Ghana, DR Congo, Morocco, Rwanda, Burundi, Poland and several Middle Eastern countries.  These Coops not only provided attractive low-rise multi-housing mixed income communities but also contributed to the restoration of the heritage homes on this street and won awards for their contribution to Sandy Hill's heritage restoration.

The Sandy Hill area is split about equally between the English speaking and the francophone population, with large communities from Somalia, Lebanon, and Haiti. The area is very close to downtown, especially to the Rideau Centre, a large downtown shopping mall.  The area is well served by mass transit and the transitway passes by the university.

Sandy Hill is often divided into four areas.  North Sandy Hill consists of the area north of Laurier Avenue.  This part of the neighbourhood is much older with many of its buildings dating from the nineteenth century. The area is subject to the  influences of more recent developments on the thoroughfare of Rideau Street.  South of Laurier is South Sandy Hill largely built after the Second World War, though there are a number of much older structures.  The far south of neighbourhood below Mann Avenue is an area known as Strathcona Heights.  This area is much smaller geographically than the other two but is as densely populated.  It consists almost entirely of low-rise apartment buildings that are either subsidised housing or co-operatives.  This area was completely redeveloped in the early 1990s.  The area below the Strathcona Heights escarpment, near the Rideau River, is known as Robinson village.  It was cut off from other neighbourhoods when highways were built, and contains low-rise houses and light industrial uses.

Notable sites

Laurier House
University of Ottawa
Strathcona Park
Heritage Canada, 5 Blackburn
Amnesty International, Canadian headquarters
Examination Unit, a secretive unit of the National Research Council (Canada) and later became Communications Security Establishment, was located at a house near Laurier House.

Notable residents

By virtue of its proximity to Parliament Hill, many past residents of Sandy Hill have been politicians.
 
Julian Armour - Musician 
Ed Broadbent - NDP Leader
Max Keeping - Television News Anchor
William Lyon Mackenzie King - Prime Minister
Wilfrid Laurier - Prime Minister
John A. Macdonald - Prime Minister
Lester B. Pearson - Prime Minister 
Elizabeth Smart - Author
Kurt Waldheim - UN Secretary General, Austrian Ambassador to Canada
Bill Westwick - Ottawa Journal sports editor
Alexander Yakovlev - so-called 'Godfather of Glasnost'

Embassies
The large homes built by the lumber barons are today popular locations for embassies and many countries are represented in the neighbourhood:

Algerian embassy (Fleck/Paterson House)
Austrian embassy
Brazilian embassy
Bruneian embassy (Stadacona Hall)
Bulgarian embassy
Burkinabé embassy
Congolese embassy
Ivoirian embassy
Croatian embassy (Toller House)
Gabonian embassy
Guinean embassy
Jamaican High Commission
Kenyan High Commission
Malian embassy
Moroccan embassy
Myanma embassy
Nigerien embassy
Pakistani High Commission
Polish embassy
Russian embassy
Senegalese embassy
Serbian embassy
Sudanese embassy
Swiss embassy
Tanzanian High Commission
Togolese embassy
Ugandan High Commission
Venezuelan embassy
Vietnamese embassy

Churches
All Nations Church
All Saints Anglican Church
Eglise Sacré-Coeur
St. Alban's Anglican Church
St. Clement Catholic Church
St. Paul's-Eastern United Church
St. Joseph's Catholic Church
St. Paul Lutheran Church

See also 
 List of Ottawa neighbourhoods

References

Exploring Ottawa: an architectural guide to the nation's capital. Harold Kalman and John Roaf. Toronto: University of Toronto Press, 1983.

External links

SandyHillSEEN: A site developed for and by Sandy Hill Residents to highlight information and happenings
Sandy Hill: History of an Ottawa Neighbourhood
Action Sandy Hill - Community Association
IMAGE - Community Newspaper
Sandy Hill History: Virtual Museum of Canada Exhibit

Neighbourhoods in Ottawa
Diplomatic districts